Lakbima News was a weekly English-language newspaper in Sri Lanka. It is published on every Sunday, by Sumathi Newspapers (Pvt) Ltd. A sister newspaper of Lakbima , Lakbima News was established in 2007.

See also
List of newspapers in Sri Lanka

References

External links
Lakbima News official website

English-language newspapers published in Sri Lanka
Publications established in 2007
Sumathi Newspapers
Sunday newspapers published in Sri Lanka